Sune Larsson (born 21 June 1930) is a retired Swedish cross-country skier. He earned a bronze medal in the 4 × 10 km relay at the 1954 FIS Nordic World Ski Championships in Falun. In 1959, he won the Vasaloppet. He was part of Swedish team reserve at the 1956 and 1960 Winter Olympics.

His younger brother Hans-Erik Larsson competed in cross-country skiing at the 1972 Olympics.

References

External links
World Championship results 
 Längdskidor Sverige: Svenska OS, VM och EM-medaljörer (Swedish cross-country skiers: Olympic Games, WM and EM medalists), www.sporthistoria.se 

Swedish male cross-country skiers
Vasaloppet winners
Living people
FIS Nordic World Ski Championships medalists in cross-country skiing
1930 births